The Act 7 Ric 2 c 5 (1383), sometimes called the Beggars Act, the Vagrancy Act, or the Vagabonds Act 1383, was an Act of the Parliament of England made at Westminster in 1383, after the Peasants' Revolt (1381).  

The Act empowered Justices of Assize, Justices of the Peace or county sheriffs to bind over vagabonds for good behaviour, or to commit them to the assizes if sureties could not be given.

The effect of this Act was modified by a proclamation of 18 February 1493, which is included in the patent roll PR (C66/574/4d), and by the Act 11 Hen 7 c 2 (1495)

The Act was extended to Ireland by Poyning's Law (10 Hen 7 c 22).

The Act was repealed as to vagabonds by the Act 39 Eliz 1 c 4 (1597). The Act was repealed as to England by section 11 of the Act 21 Jac 1 c 28 (1623). The Act was virtually repealed by the Vagrancy (Ireland) Act 1847 (10 & 11 Vict c 84). The Act was repealed as to Ireland by section 1 of, and the Schedule to, the Statute Law (Ireland) Revision Act 1872 (35 & 36 Vict c 98).

Tomlins gives the title of this Act as "For Punishment of Vagabonds". Ruffhead and Pickering give the title as "Justices, &c. shall examine Vagabonds, and bind them to their good abearing, or commit them to Prison", The Statute Law Revision (Ireland) Act 1872 describes the this Act as "Justices shall examine Vagabonds" and The Law Reports: Public General Statutes says this is the subject matter. The Chronological Table gives this Act the title "Vagabonds".

The Act includes references to faitors (feitors), drawlatches and roberdesmen.

See also
Nightwalker statute
England in the Middle Ages

References
Tudor Constitutional Documents, AD 1485-1603, by J.R. Tanner. Cambridge University Press, 1951. p. 469.
C J Ribton-Turner. A History of Vagrants and Vagrancy, and Beggars and Begging. Chapman and Hall. London. 1887. Pages 58 and 59.
C G Hall. A Legislative History of Vagrancy in England and Barbados. (Contemporary Caribbean Legal Issues, Issue No 2). University of the West Indies, Faculty of Law. 1997. Pages 4 and 6.
James Fitzjames Stephen. A History of the Criminal Law of England. Macmillan & Co. London. 1883. Volume 3. Pages 267 and 268.
James Birch Sharpe. An Inquiry into the Origin of the Office and Title of the Justice of the Peace. Shaw and Sons. London. 1841. Page 25.
Philip Rawlings. Policing: A short history. Willan Publishing. 2002. Page 46.
J A Cannon. "Vagrancy Acts". John Cannon and Robert Crowcroft (eds). The Oxford Companion to British History. Second Edition. 2015. Page 920.
A H Thomas (ed). Calendar of Select Pleas and Memoranda of the City of London. At the University Press. Cambridge. 1932. Page 6.
Hedges and Winterbottom. The Legal History of Trade Unionism. Longmans, Green & Co. 1930. Page 4. Google Books.

External links
 

1380s in law
1383 in England
Acts of the Parliament of England
Repealed English legislation
Poverty in England